Marescot Ridge is a ridge in Antarctica consisting of numerous ice-covered hills, the highest being Crown Peak at  at the south end of the ridge. It was probably observed by Captain Jules Dumont d'Urville on February 27, 1838, when he named nearby "Cap Marescot" (now Marescot Point). Following its 1946 survey, the Falkland Islands Dependencies Survey gave the name Marescot Ridge to this ridge, thinking it to be the coastal feature named by d'Urville. The name Marescot has been retained for both the ridge and the nearby point.

References

Ridges of Graham Land
Landforms of Trinity Peninsula